There have been two baronetcies created for persons with the surname Cave, one in the Baronetage of England and one in the Baronetage of the United Kingdom. Both creations are extant as of 2008.

The Cave Baronetcy, of Stanford Hall, Leicestershire, was created in the Baronetage of England on 30 June 1641. For more information on this creation, see Cave-Browne-Cave baronets.

The Cave Baronetcy, of Cleve Hill, in the parish of Mangotsfield, in the County of Gloucester, of Sidbury Manor, in the parish of Sidbury, in the County of Devon, and of Stoneleigh House, in the parish of Clifton, in the City and County of Bristol, was created in the Baronetage of the United Kingdom on 21 July 1896 for the banker Charles Cave. He was a descendant of General Sir Richard Cave, who was killed at the Battle of Naseby during the Civil War. The first Baronet's great-grandfather, John Cave (1736–1800), was the founder of the Cave bank of Bristol. As of 2018 the title is held by the first Baronet's great-great-great-grandson (the baronetcy having succeeded from father to son), the sixth Baronet, who succeeded in 2018.

Stephen Cave, elder brother of the first Baronet, was a politician who built Sidbury Manor which became the seat of the baronets.

Cave, later Cave-Browne-Cave baronets, of Stanford (1641)
see Cave-Browne-Cave baronets

Cave baronets, of Cleve Hill, Sidbury Manor and Stoneleigh House (1896)

Sir Charles Daniel Cave, 1st Baronet (1832–1922)
Sir Charles Henry Cave, 2nd Baronet JP (17 March 1861 – 26 July 1932). Cave was the son of Sir Charles Cave, 1st Baronet, and Edith Harriet Symonds, and was educated at New College, Oxford, where he graduated with a Bachelor of Arts. He was Justice of Peace for Devon and for Gloucestershire. In 1922, he succeeded in his father's baronetcy and in 1926, he was High Sheriff of Devon. Cave married Beatrice Julia Williams, daughter of Sir Frederick Williams, on 12 January 1892. They had three sons including his heir. He died in July 1932, aged 71, and was succeeded in the baronetcy by his son Edward.
Sir Edward Charles Cave, 3rd Baronet (1893–1946)
Sir Charles Edward Coleridge Cave, 4th Baronet JP DL FRICS (28 February 1927 – 1 November 1997). Cave was the son of Sir Edward Cave, 3rd Baronet, and Betty Christabel Gertrude Coleridge, and was educated at Eton College, Berkshire. In 1946, he succeeded in his father's baronetcy. Cave served in the Devonshire Regiment from 1946 to 1948, reaching the rank of Lieutenant. In 1969, he became High Sheriff of Devon, in 1972 Justice of Peace for Devon and in 1977 Deputy Lieutenant of Devon. He was further a Fellow of the Royal Institution of Chartered Surveyors. Cave married Mary Elizabeth Gore on 15 June 1957. They had four sons, including his successor, John.
Sir John Charles Cave, 5th Baronet (1958–2018), High Sheriff of Devon in 2005
Sir George Charles Cave, 6th Baronet (born 1987)

The heir presumptive is the current holder's younger brother, William Alexander Cave (born 1992).

Notes

References 
Kidd, Charles & Williamson, David (editors). Debrett's Peerage and Baronetage (1990 edition). New York: St Martin's Press, 1990, 

Cave
Cave